

Royal Thai Army 

Royal Thai Army Special Warfare Command also known as Royal Thai Army Special Forces
 Special Warfare Center
 Special Warfare School
 Basic Training Course
 Ranger Training Center
 Airborne Training Center
 Special Force Training Center
 Psychological Operations Training Course
 1st Special Forces Division
 1st Special Forces Regiment (Airborne)
 1st Special Forces Battalion (Airborne)
 2nd Special Forces Battalion (Airborne)
 2nd Special Forces Regiment (Airborne)
 1st Special Forces Battalion (Airborne)
 2nd Special Forces Battalion (Airborne)
 3rd Special Forces Regiment King's Guard (Airborne)
 Special Operation Battalion King's Guard also known as Task Force 90
 Ranger Battalion King's Guard also known as Royal Thai Army Ranger
 1st Ranger Company, Ranger Battalion, King's Guard
 2nd Ranger Company, Ranger Battalion, King's Guard
 3rd Ranger Company, Ranger Battalion, King's Guard
 4th Special Forces Regiment (Airborne)
 1st Special Forces Battalion (Airborne)
 2nd Special Forces Battalion (Airborne)
 5th Special Forces Regiment (Airborne)
 1st Special Forces Battalion (Airborne)
 2nd Special Forces Battalion (Airborne)
 Long Range Reconnaissance Patrols Company also known as LRRP
 Psychological Battalion
 Quartermaster Aerial Supply Company
 35th Signal Corp Battalion

31st Infantry Regiment also known as Rapid Deployment Force
 1st Infantry Battalion, 31st Infantry Regiment, King Bhumibol's Guard
 2nd Infantry Battalion, 31st Infantry Regiment, King Bhumibol's Guard
 3rd Infantry Battalion, 31st Infantry Regiment, King Bhumibol's Guard

Royal Thai Navy 

Naval Special Warfare Command also known as Royal Thai Navy SEALs

Royal Thai Marine Corps 

RTMC Reconnaissance Battalion also known as RECON

Royal Thai Air Force 
Royal Thai Air Force Security Force Regiment
Special Operations Regiment also known as Air Force Commando
 Command Center
 1st Special Operation Battalion (Commando)
 2nd Special Operation Battalion (PararescueJumper)
 3rd Special Operation Battalion (Combat Control Team)
 Aerial Support Company
 Combat Search and Rescue Center. (CSAR)  also known as Pararescuemen

Royal Thai Police 

Metropolitan Police Bureau
Arintharat 26

Central Investigation Bureau
Crime Suppression Division
Hanuman
Special Service Division 
Commando Special Service Division 

Special Branch Bureau
Special Operation Unit (ฺBlack Tiger)

Narcotics Suppression Bureau
Special Operation Sub-Division.also known as NSB Comando

Provincial Police Bureau
Special Operation Sub-Division Special Operation Unit (SWAT)
Provincial Police SWAT
Provincial Police Region 1 SWAT
Provincial Police Region 2 SWAT
Provincial Police Region 3 SWAT
Provincial Police Region 4 SWAT
Provincial Police Region 5 SWAT
Provincial Police Region 6 SWAT
Provincial Police Region 7 SWAT
Provincial Police Region 8 SWAT
Provincial Police Region 9 SWAT

Southern Border Provinces Police Operation Center
Special Operation Sub-Division

Border Patrol Police Bureau (BPPB)
Police Aerial Reinforcement Unit (PARU)
Naresaun 261
Search and Rescue Company
Long Range Surveillance Unit (LRSU)

External links

References